Menelik Watson (born 22 December 1988) is an English former professional American football offensive tackle. He was drafted by the Oakland Raiders in the second round of the 2013 NFL Draft. He played college football at Florida State.

Early life
Watson was born into a single-parent family of four brothers and a sister raised on the Anson Estate in Longsight, Greater Manchester, England; his mother, originally from Jamaica, worked as an office cleaner to support the family.

At Burnage High School, he excelled at sport. However, he broke his right ankle in 2001 while playing football in the park, meaning that he could not progress in his hopes of playing for Manchester City.  Advised by a doctor not to play any more sports, he eventually joined the school basketball team, where he was spotted in a local tournament by American coach Rob Orellana, who signed him up for the Canarias Basketball Academy based in the Canary Islands.

College career
Watson played college basketball for Marist College, which he attended from 2009 to 2010.

However, after it became clear that even at  Watson was too short to play power forward, Orellana transferred Watson to Saddleback College where he played American football for the first time. Watson played right tackle, opposite of left tackle Kyle Long.  After a single year at Saddleback, he transferred to Florida State University, where he started 12 of 13 games for the Florida State Seminoles football team during the 2012 season, allowing just one quarterback sack.

After his 2012 season, Watson announced his decision to forego his senior season and enter the NFL Draft.

Professional career

Oakland Raiders
Watson was drafted in the second round by the Oakland Raiders of the 2013 NFL Draft (42nd overall).

Watson dressed for five games while starting for three of them in his rookie year.

On 28 September 2014, Watson was named Raiders' honorary captain for the International Series game against the Miami Dolphins, leading the Raiders out at Wembley Stadium.

In December 2014, Watson donated his game check to a four-year-old Oakland Raiders fan with Hypoplastic left heart syndrome, which is estimated to be around $18,000.

On 30 August 2015, Watson suffered a torn Achilles tendon during the third preseason game against the Arizona Cardinals. On 1 September 2015, the Raiders placed Watson on injured reserve.

Denver Broncos
On 10 March 2017, Watson signed a three-year contract with the Denver Broncos. He started the first seven games at right tackle before suffering a calf injury and was placed on injured reserve on 8 November 2017.

On 20 August 2018, Watson was placed on injured reserve with a pectoral injury. He was released on 8 September 2018.

Personal life
Watson has a daughter Orellana—named in honour of his mentor Rob—who lives in Manchester with her mother.

References

External links
Denver Broncos bio
Oakland Raiders bio
Florida State Seminoles bio
Saddleback College bio

1988 births
Living people
People from Longsight
Sportspeople from Manchester
English expatriates in the United States
American football offensive tackles
Marist Red Foxes men's basketball players
Saddleback Gauchos football players
Florida State Seminoles football players
English players of American football
Oakland Raiders players
Denver Broncos players